is a Japanese amateur astronomer, discoverer of supernovas such as 1991bg (the first visual discovery made by a female astronomer), and co-discoverer of 4875 Ingalls, a Flora asteroid from the main-belt.

Reiki Kushida is married to astronomer Yoshio Kushida co-discoverer of 4875 Ingalls and a prolific discoverer of minor planets and comets himself. The asteroid 5239 Reiki, discovered by astronomer Shun-ei Izumikawa, was named in her honor on 6 February 1993.

References

External links 
 http://www.nayoro-star.jp/photo/tenmondai-houmon/kushida.html 

Discoverers of asteroids
20th-century Japanese astronomers
Living people
Women astronomers
Year of birth missing (living people)
20th-century Japanese women scientists